Matthew Good may refer to:
Matthew Good, is a Canadian singer-songwriter.
Matthew W. Good, Pennsylvania politician
Matt Good, American guitarist and vocalist for From First to Last

See also
Matthew Goode (born 1978), British actor
Matthew Goode and Co South Australian business house
Goode (surname)